WJRW (1340 AM) – branded as The Ticket – is a commercial sports radio station licensed to Grand Rapids, Michigan, serving the Grand Rapids metropolitan area. Owned by Cumulus Media, WJRW is the Grand Rapids affiliate for the BetQL Audio Network, CBS Sports Radio, and Fox Sports Radio. The WJRW studios and transmitter both reside in Grand Rapids. In addition to a standard analog transmission, the station also simulcasts over low-power FM translator W291DJ (106.1 FM) and is available online.

History
On September 16, 1940, the station signed on under the WLAV call sign (which stood for Leonard Adrian Versluis, the station's original owner).  It added WLAV-FM in 1947.  WLAV became a full-time Top 40 music station in the summer of 1963, and was originally consulted by Mike Joseph, who later went on to develop the Hot Hits format in the late 1970s.  One popular WLAV personality was Larry Adderley, who would later work as a sportscaster at various radio and TV stations in the Detroit media market as well as an announcer for the Detroit Tigers.

WLAV soon overtook rival stations WGRD and WMAX as the dominant hit music station in Grand Rapids, but its market share declined in the 1970s with the popularity of FM stations such as WZZM, WGRD (which had added an FM simulcast outlet), and WLAV's own sister station WLAV-FM, which found success as an album rock station. "Music Radio WLAV" went to a more adult contemporary sound in 1974, which continued until 1980, when the station tried a talk radio format as the "1340 Townhouse," featuring popular talk show hosts Lee Harris and Bob Kwesell. Call sign was WTWN.

The heritage WLAV call letters were restored in 1984, and the station flipped to oldies, which lasted for the next eight years.  Although WLAV was a modest success with oldies, it was hurt when WODJ debuted in 1989 as an FM oldies station with a stronger signal and swept the ratings.

In 1993, the format changed to a modern rock-based sound called "1340 Underground."  This happened shortly after an experiment with changing the format to modern rock on WLAV-FM had failed.  WLAV-FM then reverted to classic rock.  The "1340 Underground" format gained a considerable cult following in the Grand Rapids area, even though the night-time signal was poor.

The WBBL call letters and sports radio format debuted on May 25, 1994, when ownership of the radio station had changed.  On May 28, 2009, WBBL began simulcasting its sports programming on 107.3 FM in Greenville, which became WBBL-FM.

On July 27, 2009, the call sign on 1340 AM was changed to WJRW and the format was changed to talk radio on Tuesday, August 18, 2009.  The WJRW call letters were chosen to remind listeners that the station is co-owned and would carry many of the same Westwood One shows that are heard on 50,000 watt Detroit station WJR.  The extra "W" signifies the Grand Rapids station is in the Western part of Michigan.  WBBL-FM continued airing sports.

On January 8, 2011, the syndicated weekly Kim Komando Show switched to WJRW after airing for a decade on a competing station. Shortly thereafter, Komando's technology column began appearing in the Sunday edition of The Grand Rapids Press. On March 31, 2011, it was announced that local radio veteran Michelle McKormick would be joining WJRW as host of The Buzz with Michelle McKormick.  Her show debuted on June 6, 2011.

On January 4, 2019, the station switched to sports radio following the flip of co-owned WBBL-FM from sports to country music.  WJRW now carries a couple of shows previously heard on WBBL-FM, as well as programming from the CBS Sports Radio Network.

FM translator

References

External links

Michiguide.com – WBBL History

JRW
Sports radio stations in the United States
Radio stations established in 1940
Cumulus Media radio stations
1940 establishments in Michigan
CBS Sports Radio stations